John Chester Hughes,  (20 February 1924 – 16 October 2008) was an Anglican priest in the second half of the 20th century.

Early life and education
Hughes was born on 20 February 1924, educated at  Dulwich College  and Durham University.

Ordained ministry
Hughes was ordained in 1950. He began his career with a curacy at  St Alban, Westcliff-on-Sea after which he was Succentor at Chelmsford Cathedral. He then held incumbencies at St Barnabas, Leicester and St St John the Baptist, Croxton Kerrial.   In 1963 he became Provost of Leicester Cathedral, a post he held for 15 years. His last post before retirement in 1987 was as Vicar of St Nicholas, Bringhurst.

He died on 16 October 2008.

Honours
In November 1974, Hughes was appointed a Chaplain of the Order of St John (ChStJ).

References

1924 births
People educated at Dulwich College
Alumni of Durham University
Provosts and Deans of Leicester
2008 deaths
Chaplains of the Order of St John